Sonja L. Henning (born October 4, 1969) is an American attorney and former collegiate and professional women's basketball player. Born in Jackson, Tennessee, she grew up in Racine, Wisconsin, where she attended Horlick High School.

Stanford University

Henning played for Stanford and helped the team win the 1990 NCAA women's basketball championship.

.She attended Stanford University and played for its women's basketball team from 1987 to 1991. She helped the Cardinal win the 1990 NCAA Women's Division I Basketball Championship game, defeating Auburn University. The following year, Henning was named Pac-10 Player of the Year and a Kodak All-American in her senior season.

An economics major, Henning graduated from Stanford in 1991 with a Bachelor of Arts degree.

After graduation, there were few opportunities for women to play professional basketball in the United States at the time, so Henning started her professional career playing in a women's professional basketball team in Uppsala, Sweden in 1992.

USA Basketball
Henning was a member of the USA Women's U18 team which won the gold medal at the FIBA Americas Championship in Sao Paulo, Brazil. The event was known as the  Junior World Championship Qualifying Tournament at the time. The event was held in August 1988, when the USA team defeated the host team Brazil by a score of 70–68 to win the championship. Henning sank two free throws with under one second remaining in the game to win the final game and the gold medal.

Henning represented the US at the World Championships held in Kuala Lumpur, Malaysia in July 1990. The team won all eight games, earning the gold medal. Henning scored 2.0 points per game.

Henning again represented the USA at the 1990 Goodwill Games held in Seattle, WA during August 1990; the USA team won the gold medal. 

Henning also played with the USA team at the 1991 Pan American Games. The team finished with a record of 4–2, but managed to win the bronze medal. The USA team lost a three-point game to Brazil, then responded with wins over Argentina and Cuba, earning a spot in the medal round. The next game was a rematch against Cuba, and this time the team from Cuba won a five-point game. The USA beat Canada easily to win the bronze. Gordon averaged 3 points per game.

Duke University

After playing one season in Sweden, she enrolled in Duke University Law School in 1992 where she obtained a Juris Doctor in 1995.

Shortly after graduating from Duke, Henning starting working as an attorney specializing in labor and employment law for the Littler Mendelson law firm in Los Angeles, California.

Resuming professional basketball

In 1996, the American Basketball League (ABL) was formed, and Henning tried out for a playing spot on a team in the new league.  Henning was eventually drafted by the San Jose Lasers, a team which also featured former Stanford players Jennifer Azzi, Anita Kaplan, and Val Whiting.

She played for the Lasers for two seasons, then joined the Portland Power until financial difficulties led to the ABL's demise in 1998.

Henning joined the Women's National Basketball Association (WNBA) after being selected in the second round (24th overall pick) by the Houston Comets during its 1999 WNBA Draft and helped the Comets to its third straight WNBA championship season.  During that same year, she also served as the president of the WNBA Players Union.

In 2000, the WNBA held an expansion draft for current players to join newly formed teams.  Henning was selected by the Seattle Storm and played with the team from 2000 to part of the 2002 season until she was traded back to the Comets.

After the 2002 season ended, she became a free agent, and signed a contract with the Washington Mystics on May 5, 2003, but was waived by the team three weeks later.  In June 2003, Henning signed a contract with the Indiana Fever and played for them during that season.

Henning served as president of the Women's National Basketball Players Association from 2001 to 2003.

She retired from the WNBA in 2004.

Life after basketball

After serving two years as general counsel for Lucy.com, a startup Internet company that sells women's sporting apparel, Henning joined the law firm Tonkon Torp LLP, in Portland, Oregon.  She is currently an attorney specializing in labor and employment litigation matters.

Henning was vice president of North American League Partnership for Nike.

Henning currently serves on the board of directors for the Urban League of Portland.

In May 2005, Henning was elected to a seat on the Portland School Board with more than 70 percent of the vote.

Career statistics

Regular season

|-
| style="text-align:left;background:#afe6ba;"|1999†
| style="text-align:left;"|Houston
| 32 || 32 || 24.9 || .444 || .317 || .611 || 2.5 || 2.3 || 1.1 || 0.2 || 0.9 || 4.0
|-
| style="text-align:left;"|2000
| style="text-align:left;"|Seattle
| 32 || 32 || 30.6 || .351 || .379 || .607 || 2.7 || 2.5 || 1.9 || 0.1 || 1.7 || 5.3
|-
| style="text-align:left;"|2001
| style="text-align:left;"|Seattle
| 32 || 28 || 28.2 || .318 || .182 || .514 || 2.2 || 2.9 || 1.6 || 0.2 || 1.3 || 3.4
|-
| style="text-align:left;"|2002*
| style="text-align:left;"|Seattle
| 8 || 5 || 25.9 || .364 || .000 || .500 || 3.3 || 1.9 || 1.1 || 0.1 || 0.9 || 2.3
|-
| style="text-align:left;"|2002*
| style="text-align:left;"|Houston
| 23 || 10 || 22.7 || .346 || .250 || .455 || 2.5 || 2.2 || 1.0 || 0.3 || 1.6 || 1.9
|-
| style="text-align:left;"|2002
| style="text-align:left;"|Total
| 31 || 15 || 23.5 || .351 || .188 || .467 || 2.7 || 2.1 || 1.0 || 0.2 || 1.4 || 2.0
|-
| style="text-align:left;"|2003*
| style="text-align:left;"|Washington
| 1 || 0 || 5.0 || .000 || .000 || .000 || 0.0 || 0.0 || 1.0 || 0.0 || 0.0 || 0.0
|-
| style="text-align:left;"|2003*
| style="text-align:left;"|Indiana
| 23 || 1 || 12.6 || .262 || .000 || .250 || 1.1 || 1.3 || 0.6 || 0.0 || 0.6 || 1.0
|-
| style="text-align:left;"|2003
| style="text-align:left;"|Total
| 24 || 1 || 12.3 || .256 || .000 || .250 || 1.0 || 1.2 || 0.6 || 0.0 || 0.5 || 1.0
|-
| style="text-align:left;"|Career
| style="text-align:left;"|5 years, 4 teams
| 151 || 108 || 24.5 || .356 || .278 || .547 || 2.3 || 2.3 || 1.3 || 0.2 || 1.2 || 3.2

Playoffs

|-
| style="text-align:left;background:#afe6ba;"|1999†
| style="text-align:left;"|Houston
| 6 || 6 || 22.7 || .348 || .111 || .333 || 3.0 || 1.8 || 1.2 || 0.2 || 1.2 || 3.2
|-
| style="text-align:left;"|2002
| style="text-align:left;"|Houston
| 3 || 3 || 16.0 || .000 || .000 || .000 || 1.3 || 1.3 || 0.3 || 0.0 || 0.7 || 0.0
|-
| style="text-align:left;"|Career
| style="text-align:left;"|2 years, 1 team
| 9 || 9 || 20.4 || .250 || .091 || .333 || 2.4 || 1.7 || 0.9 || 0.1 || 1.0 || 2.1

References

External links
Tonkon Torp LLP biography
WNBA player profile
2004 Stanford Magazine article: Whatever Happened To...Sonja Henning
2003 Indiana Fever article

1969 births
Living people
All-American college women's basketball players
American expatriate basketball people in Sweden
American women lawyers
American women's basketball players
Basketball players at the 1991 Pan American Games
Basketball players from Portland, Oregon
California lawyers
Duke University School of Law alumni
Houston Comets players
Indiana Fever players
Medalists at the 1991 Pan American Games
Oregon lawyers
Pan American Games bronze medalists for the United States
Pan American Games medalists in basketball
Parade High School All-Americans (girls' basketball)
Point guards
Portland Power players
San Jose Lasers players
School board members in Oregon
Seattle Storm players
Sportspeople from Portland, Oregon
Sportspeople from Racine, Wisconsin
Stanford Cardinal women's basketball players
Women's National Basketball Association executives
William Horlick High School alumni
United States women's national basketball team players